Kiran Karmarkar (born 2 May 1958) is an Indian television, film and theatre actor. He is popularly known for his portrayal of the character Om Agarwal in the television saga Kahaani Ghar Ghar Kii (2000 - 2008) that aired on Star Plus.

Career
Karmarkar started his acting career through Marathi theatre Dinmaam in 1989 and later various cameos on television and commercial advertisements he appeared in his debut marathi film Name Nishpaap with legendary marathi actor Yashwant dutt, Vinay Apte, Suhas Joshi. His first major role came in the show Ghar Ek Mandir directed by Ekta Kapoor. He became popular for his role of Om Agarwal opposite actress Sakshi Tanwar in the show Kahaani Ghar Ghar Kii. The show aired on Star Plus and started in 2000. After the script killed the character, Karmarkar was no longer seen in it. But due to later changes in the script, the character was retrieved and he was seen playing the same role in 2007. He then went on to play various roles in TV shows. His 2006 role in the show Saarathi was of a business tycoon, inspired by Sabeer Bhatia. In 2012, he joined the popular show Uttaran playing a negative role of Tej Singh.

Karmarkar also secured small roles in Bollywood film. He has also played roles in Marathi films and plays. In 2006, he was seen playing a comedy role opposite actress Bhavana Balsavar in the play Merra Naam Joker. The play was directed by Shubha Khote. He played the lead role in the Hindi play Bas Itna Sa Khwab Hai...! opposite Shefali Shah in the year 2010. The play was directed by Chandrakant Kulkarni. For his role in the film Kshanokshani he also won the Maharashtra State Film Award. Soon, Kiran will be portraying a role in the upcoming StarPlus series, Zindagi Mere Ghar Aana.

Personal life
Karmarkar is married to actress Rinku Karmarkar née Dhawan who played his sister in the show Kahaani Ghar Ghar Kii.

The couple separated in 2017 after 15 years of marriage and filed for divorced in 2019. The duo have one son.

Filmography

Television

See also 
 List of Indian television actors

References

External links

 
 Interview

Living people
Indian male soap opera actors
Male actors in Hindi cinema
Marathi actors
Male actors from Mumbai
Indian male stage actors
Male actors in Marathi cinema
21st-century Indian male actors
1958 births